The 2015 World Touring Car Championship was a motor racing competition organised by the FIA for Super 2000 cars. It was the twelfth FIA World Touring Car Championship, and the eleventh since the series was revived in 2005. The championship comprised a Drivers Championship and a Manufacturers Championship, which were won by José María López and Citroën respectively.

Teams and drivers

Team changes
 Citroën will expand its campaign to five full-time entries from 3 full-time entries and 1 part-time entry. Four of the cars will be entered by the main factory team, while the other one will be entered by the satellite team Sébastien Loeb Racing.
 NIKA Racing will return to the series with a TC1-specification Honda Civic WTCC.
 Lada Sport will switch from the Lada Granta 1.6T to a TC1-specification Lada Vesta for the 2015 season. Also the Russian state owned oil company Rosneft will become the team's primary sponsor after the team split with Lukoil during the 2014 season.
 Liqui Moly Team Engstler, who entered 2 TC2-specification BMW 320 TC for the 2014 season, will leave the series after 8 years of participation. The team later elected to participate in the TCR International Series.
 Bamboo Engineering will return to the series as Craft Bamboo Racing with a Chevrolet RML Cruze TC1.

Mid season changes
 Dušan Borković left Proteam Racing after dispute with the team.

Calendar
The 2015 schedule was announced at a meeting of the FIA World Motor Sport Council in Doha, Qatar on 3 December 2014. The season is once again being contested over twenty-four races at twelve circuits, but will see several changes of venue. The races at Salzburgring, Spa-Francorchamps, Beijing and Macau have been removed from the schedule. The Races of Germany and Portugal returned to the calendar. Two new races were added – in Thailand at Burinam and Qatar at the Losail. On 23 January 2015, Twin Ring Motegi was announced as host of the Race of Japan. On 30 June 2015, it was announced that the season finale at the Losail International Circuit would be moved to Friday 27 November, to prevent the event from clashing with a local political event and the season finales of the 2015 Formula One season. It will be the first time WTCC will race on a Friday.

Points system
Drivers Championship points were awarded on a 25-18-15-12-10-8-6-4-2-1 basis for the first ten places in each race.
Points were also awarded on a 5-4-3-2-1 basis for the first five places after the qualifying session.

Manufacturers Championship points were awarded on the same basis as for the Drivers Championship.
Only the results obtained by the best two cars classified per manufacturer were taken into account.
All other cars of that same manufacturer were considered invisible as far as scoring points was concerned.

Results and standings

Races

Compensation weights
The most competitive cars keep a 60 kg compensation weight. The other cars get a lower one, calculated according to their results for the three previous rounds. The less the cars get some good results, the less they get a compensation weight, from 0 kg to 60 kg. For the first two rounds, all the cars had a 60 kg compensation weight.

Compensation weight comes into effect for the third round, in Hungary, with Citroën penalized by a maximum of 60 kg compensation weight, as the best results cars.

Results

Championship standings

Drivers' championship

† – Drivers did not finish the race, but were classified as they completed over 75% of the race distance.

Manufacturers' Championship

Yokohama Trophies
World Touring Car Championship promoter Eurosport Events organized the Yokohama Drivers' Trophy and the Yokohama Teams' Trophy within the 2015 FIA World Touring Car Championship.

Yokohama Drivers' Trophy

Yokohama Teams' Trophy
All non-manufacturer teams were eligible to score points towards the Yokohama Teams' Trophy.

† – Drivers did not finish the race, but were classified as they completed over 75% of the race distance.

References

External links